This article lists the wars, campaigns and battles fought by Bulgaria since its creation in 681.

Results of all wars involving Bulgaria

First Bulgarian Empire (680-1018)

Second Bulgarian Empire (1185–1396)

Principality of Bulgaria (1876-1908)

Kingdom of Bulgaria (1908-1946)

People's Republic of Bulgaria (1946-1990)

Republic of Bulgaria (1990–)

See also
 Byzantine–Bulgarian wars
 Bulgarian–Latin wars
 Bulgarian–Ottoman wars
 Bulgarian–Hungarian wars
 Bulgarian–Serbian wars
 Croatian–Bulgarian wars
 Medieval Bulgarian army
 Medieval Bulgarian navy
 Medieval warfare

References

Wars involving Bulgaria
Wars involving the First Bulgarian Empire
Wars involving the Second Bulgarian Empire
Bulgaria
Wars
Wars